Ashley Blaine Featherson-Jenkins (née Featherson; born December 4, 1987) is an American actress. She is best known as the co-creator and star of Black&SexyTV's Hello Cupid. She also appeared in the web series Roomieloverfriends, the film Bad Hair, and was a main cast member on the Netflix series Dear White People (2017–2021).

Early life and education 
Born Ashley Blaine Featherson, she was raised in Gaithersburg, Maryland. She first acted at age four in a school production and enjoyed it from that age. When she was 14 she began to perform at the Studio Theatre in Washington, DC and studied under costume designer Reggie Ray.

Featherson attended Howard University and graduated from the Fine Arts department, where she majored in musical theater. She is a member of the Alpha Kappa Alpha sorority. Featherson has stated that she most admires the career and work of Vanessa Williams.

Career 
Featherson co-created the web series Hello Cupid with Lena Waithe in 2012. The show was distributed by Black & Sexy TV and eventually rebooted. Featherson also starred in the series opposite Hayley Marie Norman.

Her first feature film role was in Justin Simien's Dear White People in 2014. She reprised the supporting role of Joelle in the 2017 Netflix television series adaptation of the same name.

She co-starred in the 2018 web series Leimert Park, which premiered at Sundance. Featherson also appeared in the re-creation of the photograph "A Great Day in Harlem", organized by Netflix's Strong Black Lead initiative.

In 2020, she collaborated with Simien again on his comedy horror film Bad Hair. That year she also worked with The Lip Bar on a makeup campaign. She also helped develop a three-piece collection for dark skinned women with Mented Cosmetics.

Personal life 
Featherson announced her engagement to sports agent Darroll Jenkins in September 2020, and married him on September 5, 2021 at Hummingbird Nest Ranch in Santa Susana, California. Longtime friends, they began dating in 2018.

Filmography

Film

Television

References

External links 

Ashley Blaine Featherson on Instagram

Living people
Actresses from Maryland
21st-century American actresses
African-American actresses
Howard University alumni
Alpha Kappa Alpha members
1987 births
21st-century African-American women
21st-century African-American people
20th-century African-American people
20th-century African-American women